The Lion Hunters is a 1951 American adventure film directed by Ford Beebe and starring Johnny Sheffield, Morris Ankrum and Ann E. Todd. It was the fifth in the 12-film Bomba, the Jungle Boy series. The film's sets were designed by the art directors Dave Milton and Vin Taylor.

Plot Summary
A lion trapper [and his daughter] rendezvous with his hardheaded partner in the African jungle. Bomba befriends the girl, Jean, and explains to her why trapping lions is not right, and she comes to understand him; he later sabotages the men's plans, and with assistance from local Masai natives and lions, runs them off. In this film, Bomba uses the word "Ungawa" for the first time.

Cast
 Johnny Sheffield as Bomba
 Morris Ankrum as Tom Forbes
 Ann E. Todd as Jean Forbes
 Douglas Kennedy as Marty Martin
 Smoki Whitfield as Jonas 
 Davis Roberts as Lohu
 Woody Strode [in his first credited role] as Walu

References

External links
 
 The Lion Hunters at TCMDB
 
 

1951 films
American adventure films
Films directed by Ford Beebe
Films produced by Walter Mirisch
Monogram Pictures films
American black-and-white films
1951 adventure films
1950s English-language films
1950s American films